In electrochemistry, CO stripping is a special process of voltammetry where a monolayer of carbon monoxide already adsorbed on the surface of an electrocatalyst is electrochemically oxidized and thus removed from the surface. A well-known process of this type is CO stripping on Pt/C electrocatalysts in which the electrooxidation peak occurs somewhere between 0.5 to 0.9 V depending on the characteristics and structural properties of the specimen.

Principle 
Some metals, such as platinum, readily adsorb carbon monoxide, which is usually undesirable as it results in catalyst poisoning.

However, the strong affinity of CO to such catalysts also presents an opportunity: since carbon monoxide is a small molecule with a strong affinity to the catalyst, a large enough amount of CO will adsorb to the entire available surface area of the catalyst. That, in turn, means that by evaluating the amount of CO adsorbed, the catalyst's available surface area can be indirectly measured.

That surface area - also known as "real surface area" or "electrochemically active surface area" - can be measured by electrochemically oxidizing the adsorbed carbon monoxide, as the charge expended in oxidizing CO is directly proportional to the amount of CO adsorbed on the surface and therefore, the surface area of the catalyst.

Usage 
CO stripping is one of the methods used to determine the electrochemically active surface area of electrodes and catalysts that irreversibly adsorb carbon monoxide, most notably ones containing platinum and other transition metals.

References 

Separation processes
Electroanalytical methods
Electrochemistry